Arizona's 25th Legislative District is one of 30 in the state, situated in southeast Maricopa County. As of 2021, there are 42 precincts in the district, with a total registered voter population of 150,866. The district has an overall population of 245,560.

Political representation
The district is represented for the 2021–2022 Legislative Session in the State Senate by Tyler Pace (R, Mesa) and in the House of Representatives by Russell Bowers (R, Mesa) and Michelle Udall (R, Mesa).

References

Maricopa County, Arizona
Arizona legislative districts